Cubanichthys pengelleyi, the Jamaican killifish, is a species  of killifish from the family Cyprinodontidae, the pupfishes, which is endemic to Jamaica. These have a substrate consisting mainly of sand with some softer patches of silt. This species hides among aquatic vegetation. Its prey consists of damselfly and dragonfly larvae, the larvae of other aquatic insects, ostracods, copepods and snails. The specific name honours the Jamaican physician and medical officer Charles Edward Pengelley (1888–1966) who obtained the type.

References

pengellyi
Fish described in 1939